Oru Painkilikatha is a 1984 Indian Malayalam-language film, directed by Balachandra Menon and produced by Varada Balachandra Menon. The film stars Madhu, Srividya, Balachandra Menon and Rohini in the lead roles. The film has musical score by A. T. Ummer. The film was remade in Tamil as Thaiku Oru Thalattu and in Telugu as Samsaram.

Cast
 
Madhu as Madhavankutty 
Srividya as Rajeswari 
Balachandra Menon as Kannan 
Rohini as Vilasini 
Kaviyoor Ponnamma as Ponnu / kamalaakshi
Venu Nagavally as Gopi
Bharath Gopi as Swami 
Kundara Johnny as Nandakumar I.A.S 
Manochithra as Rani
Uma Bharani as Thankam

Soundtrack
The music was composed by A. T. Ummer.

References

External links
 

Films directed by Balachandra Menon
1984 films
1980s Malayalam-language films
Malayalam films remade in other languages